Fossati may refer to:

The Fossati brothers, Gaspare (1809-1883) and Giuseppe (1822-1891), were Swiss architects.
Alessandra Fossati, Italian high-jumper
Domenico Fossati (1743-1785), Italian painter, engraver and decorator
Ivano Fossati, Italian singer
Virgilio Fossati, (1889-1918) Italian footballer
Jorge Fossati, Uruguayan footballer manager
 Marco Fossati (born 1992) Italian footballer
Maurilio Fossati, (1876-1965) Italian Catholic cardinal
Paolo Fossati, (1938-1998) Italian author